The following lists events that happened during  1960 in New Zealand.

Population
 Estimated population as of 31 December: 2,403,600
 Increase since 31 December 1959: 43,900 (1.86%)
 Males per 100 females: 101.0

Incumbents

Regal and viceregal
Head of State – Elizabeth II
Governor-General – The Viscount Cobham GCMG TD.

Government
The 32nd New Zealand Parliament continued. In power was the Second Labour government under Walter Nash. The general election saw the governing Labour Party defeated by a twelve-seat margin, and replaced by the Second National government.

Speaker of the House – Robert Macfarlane.
Prime Minister – Walter Nash then Keith Holyoake
Deputy Prime Minister – Jerry Skinner then Jack Marshall.
Minister of Finance – Arnold Nordmeyer then Harry Lake.
Minister of Foreign Affairs – Walter Nash then Keith Holyoake.
Attorney-General – Rex Mason, then Ralph Hanan.
Chief Justice — Sir Harold Barrowclough

Parliamentary opposition 
 Leader of the Opposition –   Keith Holyoake (National) until 12 December, then Walter Nash (Labour)

Main centre leaders
Mayor of Auckland – Dove-Myer Robinson
Mayor of Hamilton – Denis Rogers
Mayor of Wellington – Frank Kitts
Mayor of Christchurch – George Manning
Mayor of Dunedin – Stuart Sidey

Events 

 Passing of the Waitangi Day Act 1960, first step towards a national day.
 26 November: 1960 New Zealand general election

Arts and literature
Maurice Duggan wins the Robert Burns Fellowship.

See 1960 in art, 1960 in literature

Music

See: 1960 in music

Radio and television

 1 June: At 7.30 pm New Zealand's first official television transmission begins. For the first six weeks programs are limited to two hours a night and two nights a week. In mid-July this is extended to four nights a week. A television licence fee of £4 per year is introduced in August.

Film

See: :Category:1960 film awards, 1960 in film, List of New Zealand feature films, Cinema of New Zealand, :Category:1960 films

Sport
 See: 1960 in sports, :Category:1960 in sports

Athletics
 Ray Puckett wins his third national title in the men's marathon, clocking 2:23:12.6 on 8 March in Invercargill.

Chess
 The 67th National Chess Championship was held in Dunedin, and was won by Ortvin Sarapu of Auckland.

Cricket
 The Australian team toured but games against the national side did not have Test status.
 Plunket Shield was won by Canterbury (1959-1960 season)

Horse racing

Harness racing
 New Zealand Trotting Cup – False Step (3rd win)
 Auckland Trotting Cup – Damian

Lawn bowls
The national outdoor lawn bowls championships are held in Dunedin.
 Men's singles champion – Stanley Snedden (Linwood Bowling Club)
 Men's pair champions – E.H. Taylor, Pete Skoglund (skip) (Carlton Bowling Club)
 Men's fours champions – H. Roy, J. Scott, B. Moore, Bill O'Neill (skip) (Carlton Bowling Club)

Olympic Games

Summer Olympics

 New Zealand enters 38 competitors in nine sports, winning two gold (Peter Snell – Athletics, Men's 800m, Murray Halberg – Athletics, Men's 5,000m) and one bronze (Barry Magee – Athletics, Men's Marathon) medals.

Winter Olympics

 New Zealand enters the Winter Olympics for the second time, with a team of four competitors.

Rugby league
 New Zealand national rugby league team
 Rugby League World Cup

Rugby union
 The All Blacks toured South Africa, losing the four-test series 2–1 with one game drawn.
 25 June, Ellis Park, Johannesburg: New Zealand 0 – 13 South Africa
 23 July, Newlands, Cape Town: New Zealand 11 – 3 South Africa
 13 Aug, Free State Stadium, Blomfontein: New Zealand 11 – 11 South Africa
 27 August, Boet Erasmus, Port Elizabeth:	New Zealand 3 – 8 South
 Ranfurly Shield: Auckland managed successful defences against Thames Valley (22-6) and Counties (14-3) before losing to North Auckland, 17–11. North Auckland managed to defend the shield against Poverty Bay, (24-3) before losing 3–6 to Auckland. Auckland held the shield for the remainder of the season, beating Manawatu (31-8), Bay of Plenty (9-6), Wellington (22-9), Taranaki (25-6) and Canterbury (19-18).

Soccer
 The national men's team made a short tour to Tahiti.
 5 September, Papeete: NZ 5 – 1 Tahiti
 8 September, Papeete: NZ 8 – 0 Tahiti Juniors
 12 September, Papeete: NZ 2 – 1 Tahiti
 Chatham Cup won by North Shore United, who beat Technical Old Boys (of Christchurch) 5–3 in the final.
 Provincial league champions:
	Auckland:	North Shore United
	Bay of Plenty:	Kahukura
	Buller:	Waimangaroa United
	Canterbury:	Western
	Franklin:	Papatoetoe
	Hawke's Bay:	Napier Rovers
	Manawatu:	Kiwi United
	Marlborough:	Woodbourne
	Nelson:	Athletic
	Northland:	Otangarei United
	Otago:	Northern AFC
	Poverty Bay:	Eastern Union
	South Canterbury:	Thistle
	Southland:	Invercargill Thistle
	Taranaki:	Moturoa
	Waikato:	Hamilton Technical OB
	Wairarapa:	YMCA
	Wanganui:	Blue Rovers
	Wellington:	Railways
	West Coast:	Cobden-Kohinoor

Births
 21 January: Phil Horne, cricketer
 15 February: Michael James "Jock" Hobbs, rugby player and administrator
 6 April: Richard Loe, rugby player
 10 April – Rex Wilson, long-distance runner
 2 May – Rhys Jones, New Zealand Army officer
 14 May: Frank Nobilo, golfer
 7 June: Lianne Dalziel, politician
 15 July: Gary Robertson, cricketer
 9 September: Chris White, rower
 29 September: Tau Henare, politician
 1 November: Jenny Bornholdt, poet
 17 December: Steve Walsh, long jumper
 26 December: Temuera Morrison, actor

Deaths
 17 January Andrew Kennaway Henderson, illustrator, cartoonist and pacifist. (b. 1879)
 1 June Alfred Murdoch, politician. (b. 1877)
 25 July Edgar Neale, politician. (b. 1889)
 10 September: Sir Harold Gillies, plastic surgery pioneer (b. 1882)
 8 October Sir William Polson, politician.  (b. 1875)
 29 November Sir Andrew Hamilton Russell, soldier. (b. 1868)

See also
List of years in New Zealand
Timeline of New Zealand history
History of New Zealand
Military history of New Zealand
Timeline of the New Zealand environment
Timeline of New Zealand's links with Antarctica

References

External links
 1960s decade study (NZHistory website)

 
Years of the 20th century in New Zealand